This is a list of current and former television programmes broadcast on TG4 and its children's programming block Cúla4.

Current programming

Chat

7 Lá
Ardán

Children's

Adventure Time
ALVINNN!!! and the Chipmunks
Astroblast!
AstroKids
Balloon Barnyard
Best Sports Ever
Big Block SingSong
Big Bear and Squeak
Breadwinners
Calimero
Camp Lakebottom
Captain Flinn and the Pirate Dinosaurs
The Cat in the Hat Knows a Lot About That!
Chloe's Closet
Clarence
Clifford the Big Red Dog
Curious George
Daisy & Ollie
Dee Dee The Little Sorceress
Dennis and Gnasher
The Dog & Pony Show
Dora the Explorer
Dot.
Dinosaur Train
Earth to Luna!
Elias: The Little Rescue Boat
Ella Bella Bingo
Esme & Roy
Everybody Loves Moose
Fanboy & Chum Chum
Fangbone!
Florrie's Dragons
Go, Diego, Go!
Helen's Little School
Heroes of Envell
Horrid Henry (as Dónal Dána)
Igam Ogam
Inis Cúil
Inspector Gadget (2015)
Inui
Jamie's Got Tentacles
Johnny Test
The Jungle Bunch
Kid-E-Cats
Kioka
Let's Play
Little Tournament Over Yonder AdventuresMasha and the BearMaya the BeeMessy Goes to OkidoMiraculous: Tales of Ladybug and Cat NoirMoukNature Cat (as Cat Cliste)Numb ChucksNumberblocks (as Blocuimhreacha)OliviaOlive The OstrichOlly the Little White VanOlobob TopOswaldoPajanimalsPat the DogPeg + CatPJ MasksThe Polos (as Na Polos)PocoyoPunkyQ Pootle 5Raa Raa the Noisy LionRanger RobRekkit RabbitRev & RollRita & CrocodileRoad to AvonleaSadie SparksSantiago of the SeasSaol Faoi ShráidScaredy SquirrelSchool of RoarsSíleSpace Chickens in SpaceSpace RacersSkunk FuSpongeBob SquarePantsT.U.F.F. PuppyTaffyTeam UmizoomiThat's JoeyTickety TocTimmy TimeToonMartyTrue and the Rainbow KingdomWanda and the AlienWinston Steinburger and Sir Dudley Ding DongWissperWoozle and PipWussywat the Clumsy CatZack and QuackZak JinksZouComedyC.U. BurnFear an PhoistFFCGleann CeoThe Golden GirlsLuí na GréineSouth ParkThe WaltonsThe Wonder YearsDatingEochair an ghráPaisean FaiseanDocumentaryAg Trasnú an Atlantaigh DhuibhÁr gClubBádóiríBean an TíCeolchuairtCogarÉalúAn Fhidil Bheo - Ceol an Northern FiddlerFíorscéalMéirlighNo BéarlaScothfhoirneSeal le DáithíTabúWwoofáilThar SáileTimpeall na TíreTríd an LionsaUachtaráinDramaAifricThe Almighty JohnsonsBorgenBetter Call SaulFriday Night LightsGilmore GirlsThe KillingMurder, She WroteNashvilleRos na RúnSeacht / SevenThe Vampire DiariesHistoryCartaí PoistÉire NeodrachSéideán StaireSiar Sna…MusicFloscGeantraíGradam Ceoil TG4HupIs Maith liom PopNollaig No. 1Réalta agus GaoltaScór Encore'Sé mo LaochSlí na mBeaglaoichTradFestNewsEuronewsFrance 24Nuacht TG4SportGAA BeoRugbaí BeoSacar BeoUnderdogsWimbledon BeoTravelAmú le HectorHecor i MeiriceáHector san AfraicHector san AstráilNeeloFormer programming8 Simple Rules (comedy)America's Next Top Model (reality)Amú Amigos (travel)An Audience with Billy Connolly (comedy)Angela Anaconda (children's)Angelo Rules (children's)Animal Mechanicals (children's)The Animals of Farthing Wood (children's) (Original English voices can be still screened on RTÉ)Animated Tales of the World (children's) (also airs on RTÉ)Animaniacs (children's) (still airs on RTÉ years later)Army Wives (drama)Arthur (children's)Asteroid in Love (yonkoma)Baby Bollies (children's) (also aired on RTÉ)Back at the Barnyard (children's)Baby Looney Tunes (children's)The Baskervilles (children's)The Batman (children's)The Big Knights (children's)Bo on the Go! (children's)Bouli (children's) (originally aired on RTÉ, later returned to air on RTÉ in 1999 with an English dub)Ben 10 (Original series) (children's)Ben 10: Alien Force (Humungousaur) (children's)Bert and Ernie's Great Adventures (children's)Blinky Bill (children's)Bonanza (comedy)Breaking Bad (drama)The Brothers Flub (children's) (originally aired on TV3)Britt Allcroft's Magic Adventures of Mumfie (children's) (later aired on RTÉ still dubbed in Irish)The Canterbury Tales (children's)Carnivàle (drama)Charley and Mimmo (children's)Chop Socky Chooks (children's)CinderElmo (children's)Clifford the Big Red Dog (children's)Cocco Bill (children's)Coconut Fred's Fruit Salad Island (children's)Codename: Kids Next Door (children's)The Cramp Twins (children's)Cat Tales (children's)Clang Invasion (children's)Cold Case (drama)Curb Your Enthusiasm (comedy)Cybernet (magazine)Dastardly and Muttley in Their Flying Machines (children's) (originally aired on RTÉ)Delfy and His Friends (children's)Doodlebops (children's)Dragon Tales (children's)Driver Dan's Story Train (children's) (Now on 3e)Doctor Who (science fiction)Edgar and Ellen (children's)Eliot Kid (children's)Eloise: The Animated Series (children's)Eve (comedy)Everwood  (drama)Elmo's World (children's)E-Ring (drama)Fairy Tale Police Department (children's)Foster's Home for Imaginary Friends (children's)Four Eyes! (children's)Flash Gordon Conquers the Universe (science fiction)The Further Adventures of SuperTed (children's)Flipper and Lopaka (children's)Freaky Stories (children's)Fraggle Rock (children's) (originally aired on RTÉ)Franny's Feet (children's)Firehouse Tales (children's)Fun with Claude (children's)The Garfield Show (children's)Generation O! (children's)George Lopez (comedy)Global Grover (children's)Gossip Girl  (drama)Gogs (Claymation)Hareport (children's)Horseland (children's)Higglytown Heroes (children's)Hiudai T.N.T. (children's)The Hoobs (children's)I.N.K. Invisible Network of Kids (children's)Incredible Story Studios (children's)Inspector Gadget (1983) (original series) (children's) (originally aired on RTÉ, later returned to air on RTÉ in 2000)Invasion  (drama)In a Heartbeat (children's)Jay Jay the Jet Plane (children's)Jungledyret Hugo (children's)Junior/J-squad (children's)Justice League (children's)Kappa Mikey (children's)Kirby: Right Back at Ya! (children's)Kong: The Animated Series (children's)Kangoos (children's)Lapitch the Little Shoemaker (children's)The Life and Times of Juniper Lee (children's)The Little Lulu Show (children's)Little Monsters (children's) (later aired on RTÉ)Lipstick Jungle  (drama)Life with Derek (children's)Lizzie McGuire (children's)Lola & Virginia (children's)Looney Tunes (children's) (originally aired on RTÉ)Loopdidoo (children's)Lou! (children's)The Lucy Show (comedy)Machair (soap opera)Madison (drama)The Man from U.N.C.L.E. (drama)Milo (children's)Mimi and Mr. Bobbo (children's)Monster Allergy (children's)Monster Rancher (children's)Muppets Tonight (comedy) (originally aired on RTÉ)The Muppet Show (comedy) (originally aired on RTÉ)The Mr. Men Show (children's)My Spy Family (children's)Nick & Perry (children's)The Nightmare Room (children's)Nip/Tuck  (drama)The O.C.  (drama)Old Tom (children's)Olivia (children's)One Tree Hill  (drama)Oz  (drama)Patrol 03 (children's)Peppa Pig (children's) (later aired on RTÉ)Pigs Next Door (children's)Pingu (children's)The Pinky and Perky Show (children's)Play with Me Sesame (children's)Poochini's Yard (children's)Potatoes and Dragons (children's)Power Rangers in Space (children's)Power Rangers Turbo (children's)Pet Alien (Dinko) (children's)Puppy in My Pocket: Adventures in Pocketville (children's)Redakai: Conquer the Kairu (children's)Rainbow Fish (children's)Robot Wars (Original series) (with commentary dubbed in Irish)Romuald the Reindeer (children's) (later aired on RTÉ)Sandra the Fairytale Detective (children's)Spaced Out (children's)Stone Protectors (children's)Stories from My Childhood (children's)Skeleton Warriors (children's)Starhill Ponies (children's)Sali Mali (children's)Samantha Who? (comedy)Samurai Jack (children's)Scaredy Squirrel (children's)Scooby-Doo and Scrappy-Doo (children's) (originally aired on RTÉ)Sea Princesses (children's)Shaggy & Scooby-Doo Get a Clue! (children's)Simba: The King Lion (children's) (later aired on RTÉ)Six Feet Under (drama)Small Stories (children's)The Starter Wife (comedy / drama)Superman: The Animated Series (children's)SuperTed (children's) (originally aired on RTÉ)Survivor (reality)S.O.S. Croc (children's)Tractor Tom (children's) (also airs on RTÉ)Tabaluga (children's)Tec the Tractor (children's)Tom and Jerry (children's) (originally aired on RTÉ)Tom and Jerry Tales (children's)Tommy and Oscar (children's)Twipsy (children's)Teletubbies (Original Series) (children's) (also airs on RTÉ)Teo (children's)TG4 Cruinneas! (children's)The Three Friends and Jerry (children's)The Triplets (Children's) Triple Z (children's)Time Squad (children's)ToddWorld (children's)Top Cat (children's) (also airs on RTÉ)True Blood  (drama)Twipsy (children's)Two and a Half Men (comedy)UBOS (children's)Undergrads (animation)The Vampire Diaries  (drama)Vanished  (drama)Watership Down (children's) (also airs on RTÉ)Weird-Oh's (children's)Wendy (children's)Witch World (children's)Winx Club (children's)Whatever Happened to Robot Jones? (children's)What About Mimi (children's)What I Like About You (comedy)Wipeout (game show) (partly Irish)The Wire (drama)Wonder Pets (children's)What's New, Scooby-Doo? (children's) (later aired on RTÉ)Without a Trace (drama)X-DuckX (children's)Xiaolin Showdown (children's)Zirkos Kids (children's)Z-Squad'' (children's)

References

TG4